Colin McLeod Telfer (born 26 February 1947, in Hawick) is a former Scotland international rugby union player. He played at fly-half.

Rugby Union career

Amateur career

He went to the Royal High School in Edinburgh, but did not go on to play for Royal HSFP.

He instead played for Hawick.

Provincial career

He played for South of Scotland District and captained the side.

International career

He was capped seventeen times for Scotland between 1968 and 1976.

Coaching career

He was Head Coach of Scotland in 1984.

References

Bibliography
 
 Bath, Richard ed (2007). The Scotland Rugby Miscellany. Vision Sports Publishing Ltd. .
 Jones, J.R. (1976). Encyclopedia of Rugby Union Football. Robert Hale, London, .

1947 births
Living people
Hawick RFC players
Hawick Trades players
People educated at the Royal High School, Edinburgh
Rugby union players from Hawick
Scotland international rugby union players
Scotland national rugby union team coaches
Scottish rugby union players